Poutchine au sac (literally: pudding in a bag) is a bag pudding and a Métis dish made of beef suet, flour, brown sugar, raisins, currants, and milk. The ingredients are combined in a cotton bag or sealer jars, then steamed. The cooked dish is usually topped with a sauce made from sugar, cornstarch, vanilla and nutmeg.

See also 
 Figgy duff (pudding), a bag pudding from Newfoundland
 Clootie dumpling, a similar Scottish traditional pudding

References

Métis culture
Indigenous cuisine in Canada
Puddings
Canadian desserts